Bishop Municipal Airport  is a city-owned public-use airport located three nautical miles (3.5 mi, 5.6 km) northeast of the central business district of Bishop, a city in Nueces County, Texas, United States.

Facilities and aircraft 
It has one runway designated 15/33 with an asphalt surface measuring 3,200 by 50 feet (975 x 15 m).

For the 12-month period ending March 5, 2011, the airport had 5,400 general aviation aircraft operations, an average of 14 per day. At that time there were 18 single-engine aircraft based at this airport.

References

External links 
  at Texas DOT Airport Directory
 Aerial image as of February 1995 from USGS The National Map
 

Airports in Texas
Buildings and structures in Nueces County, Texas
Transportation in Nueces County, Texas